"Someday" is a song co-written and recorded by American country music artist Vince Gill. It was released in March 2003 as the second single from the album Next Big Thing. The song reached No. 31 on the Billboard Hot Country Singles & Tracks chart.  The song was written by Gill and Richard Marx.

Chart performance

References

2003 singles
2003 songs
Vince Gill songs
Songs written by Vince Gill
Songs written by Richard Marx
MCA Nashville Records singles
Black-and-white music videos